Impolex is a 2009 American film written, produced, edited and directed by Alex Ross Perry in his feature directorial debut. It stars Riley O'Bryan, Kate Lyn Sheil, Ben Shapiro, Bruno Meyrick Jones, Roy Berkeley, Brandon Prince and Eugene Mirman. The film is inspired by Thomas Pynchon's 1973 novel Gravity's Rainbow.

Plot
Tyrone (Riley O'Bryan) embarks upon a  journey into  frustration, trying to locate German V-2 rockets at the end of World War II.

Cast
 Riley O'Bryan as Tyrone S.
 Kate Lyn Sheil as Katie
 Bruno Meyrick Jones as Adrian the Pirate
 Ben Shapiro as Robinson 
 Roy Berkeley as Lazlo
 Eugene Mirman as Talking Octopus

References

External links
 

2009 films
2000s adventure films
Films directed by Alex Ross Perry
Films with screenplays by Alex Ross Perry
2009 directorial debut films
2000s English-language films
American adventure films
American World War II films
2000s American films